Avril Phaedra Douglas "Kim" Campbell  (born March 10, 1947) is a Canadian politician, diplomat, lawyer, and writer who served as the 19th prime minister of Canada from June 25 to November 4, 1993. Campbell is the first and so far only female prime minister of Canada. Prior to becoming the final Progressive Conservative (PC) prime minister, she was also the first woman to serve as minister of justice in Canadian history and the first woman to become minister of defence in a NATO member state.

Campbell was first elected to the British Columbia Legislative Assembly as a member of the British Columbia Social Credit Party in 1986 before being elected to the House of Commons of Canada as a PC in 1988. Under Prime Minister Brian Mulroney, she occupied numerous cabinet positions including minister of justice and attorney general, minister of veterans affairs and minister of national defence from 1990 to 1993. Campbell became the new prime minister in June 1993 after Mulroney resigned in the wake of declining popularity. In the 1993 Canadian federal election in October of that year, the Progressive Conservatives were decimated, losing all but two seats from a previous majority, with Campbell losing her own. Her 132-day premiership is the third-shortest in Canadian history.

Campbell was also the first baby boomer to hold the office, as well as the only prime minister born in British Columbia. She is the chairperson for the Canadian Supreme Court advisory board.

Early life
Campbell was born in Port Alberni, British Columbia, the daughter of Phyllis "Lissa" Margaret (née Cook; 1923–2013) and George Thomas Campbell (1920–2002), a barrister who had served with the Seaforth Highlanders of Canada in Italy. Her father was born in Montreal, to Scottish parents from Glasgow.

While she was in her preteens, Campbell and her family moved to Vancouver. Campbell was one of five co-hosts and reporters on the CBC children's program Junior Television Club, which aired in May and June 1957.

Her mother left when Campbell was 12, leaving Kim and her sister Alix to be raised by their father. As a teenager, Campbell nicknamed herself Kim. In Vancouver, Campbell attended Prince of Wales Secondary School and was a top student. She became the school's first female student president, and graduated in 1964.

University and early career
Campbell earned an honours bachelor's degree in political science from the University of British Columbia, graduating in 1969. She was active in the student government and served as the school's first female president of the freshman class. She then completed a year of graduate study at that school, to qualify for doctoral-level studies. Campbell entered the London School of Economics in 1970 to study towards her doctorate in Soviet government, and spent three months touring the Soviet Union, from April to June 1972. She had spent several years studying the Russian language, and claimed she was nearly fluent, although when asked to say a few words of welcome by a reporter to Boris Yeltsin during his visit to Canada in 1993, she could not and could only say "Hello Mr. Yeltsin". Campbell ultimately left her doctoral studies, returning to live in Vancouver after marrying Nathan Divinsky, her longtime partner, in 1972. She earned an LL.B. from the University of British Columbia in 1983. She was called to the British Columbia Bar in 1984, and practised law in Vancouver until 1986.

Family and early political career
During her marriage to Divinsky, Campbell lectured part-time in political science at the University of British Columbia and at Vancouver Community College. While still attending law school, she entered politics as a trustee on the Vancouver School Board, becoming, in 1983, the chair of that board and serving in 1984 as its vice-chair. She once claimed to have told the board to "back off", although others alleged that she said "fuck off". In total, she was a trustee there from 1980 to 1984. Campbell and Divinsky were divorced in 1983, and Campbell married Howard Eddy in 1986, a marriage that lasted until shortly before she became prime minister. Campbell is the second prime minister of Canada to have been divorced, after Pierre Trudeau.

She briefly dated Gregory Lekhtman, the inventor of Exerlopers, during her term as prime minister, but the relationship was relatively private and she did not involve him in the 1993 election campaign. She is currently married to Hershey Felder, an actor, playwright, composer, and concert pianist.

Provincial politics
Campbell was the unsuccessful British Columbia Social Credit Party candidate in Vancouver Centre for a seat in the Legislative Assembly of British Columbia in 1983, receiving 12,740 votes (19.3% in a double-member riding). She then briefly worked in the office of Premier Bill Bennett. Campbell ran unsuccessfully for the leadership of the Social Credit party the summer of 1986 (placing last with 14 votes from delegates), but was elected in October 1986 to the British Columbia Legislative Assembly as a Social Credit member for Vancouver-Point Grey, getting 19,716 votes (23.2%, also in a double-member riding). Consigned to the backbenches, she became disenchanted with Premier Bill Vander Zalm's leadership and broke with him and Social Credit over the issue of abortion, which Vander Zalm opposed. Campbell decided to leave provincial politics and enter federal politics.

Federal politics
Campbell was elected in the 1988 federal election as the member of Parliament (MP) from Vancouver Centre.  She won the party nomination after the incumbent, Pat Carney, declined to stand for renomination. In 1989, Campbell was appointed to the cabinet as minister of state (Indian affairs and northern development), a junior role to the minister of Indian and northern affairs.  From 1990 to 1993, she held the post of minister of justice and attorney general, overseeing notable amendments to the Criminal Code in the areas of firearms control and sexual assault.  In 1990, following the Supreme Court's decision to invalidate the country's abortion law, Campbell was responsible for introducing Bill C-43 to govern abortions in Canada. Although it passed the House of Commons, it failed to pass the Senate, leaving Canada with no national law governing abortions.
 
In 1993, Campbell was transferred to the posts of minister of national defence and minister of veterans affairs. Notable events during her tenure included dealing with the controversial issue of replacing shipborne helicopters for the navy and for search-and-rescue units. The actions by Canadian Airborne Regiment in the scandal known as the Somalia Affair also first emerged while Campbell was minister. When the Liberal Party of Canada took power, the incident became the subject of a lengthy public inquiry, continuing to focus attention on Campbell and the PCs.

David Milgaard
Upon assumption of the Justice portfolio, Campbell was handed the petition for a new trial in the case of David Milgaard, a man who had been wrongfully convicted for murder in 1970 and spent decades trying to clear his name before being exonerated in 1993. In her autobiography, Time and Chance, Campbell wrote that she came under "considerable pressure" from the public and was "bombarded with questions from the media and [from opposition MPs] in Question Period" about the case before she was even officially assigned to Milgaard's petition to direct a new trial in the case. She said that her decision was delayed by Milgaard's legal team's repeated addition of new submissions to the appeal, which she was not allowed to review until all such submissions were complete. In mid-January 1991, she informed Milgaard's legal team that evidence was insufficient to grant the petition. When later Mulroney was confronted by Milgaard's mother, he had "saluted her courage and determination and ... show[n] his concern for her son's health", which "blindsided" and "floored" Campbell and was interpreted by media and some MPs as evidence that the prime minister had taken sides in the case. Campbell says she "told the press [that] Mulroney was much too good a lawyer to intervene improperly" and "never breathed a word" to her about it, nor did anyone in his office attempt to influence her decision. Despite this, she wrote, Milgaard's mother "is convinced he did, and the media accepted this view," which made it difficult for her to convince others that her officials were motivated solely by "a desire to make the right decision."

Prime minister (June–November 1993)

Mulroney entered 1993 facing a statutory federal election. By then, his popularity had markedly declined, and polls suggested that the Tories would be heavily defeated if he led them into that year's election. In February 1993, Mulroney announced his retirement from politics, to take effect after his successor had been chosen. Campbell entered the party leadership race to succeed Mulroney. Campbell had served in four cabinet portfolios prior to running for the party leadership, including three years as minister of justice, and garnered support of more than half the PC caucus when she declared for the leadership.

She defeated Jean Charest at the Progressive Conservative leadership convention that June, and Governor General Ray Hnatyshyn appointed her prime minister on June 25. As a concession to Charest, Campbell appointed him to the posts of deputy prime minister and minister of industry, science, and technology—the first largely symbolic, and the second a significant cabinet portfolio position.

After becoming party leader and prime minister, Campbell set about reorganizing the cabinet. She cut it from 35 to 23 ministers; she consolidated ministries by creating three new ministries: Health, Canadian Heritage, and Public Security. Campbell extensively campaigned during the summer, touring the nation and attending barbecues and other events. In August 1993, a Gallup Canada poll showed Campbell as having a 51% approval rating, which placed her as Canada's most popular prime minister in 30 years. By the end of the summer, her personal popularity had increased greatly, far surpassing that of Liberal Party leader Jean Chrétien. Support for the Progressive Conservative Party had also increased to within a few points of the Liberals, while the Reform Party had been reduced to single digits.

Campbell was the first Canadian prime minister not to have resided at 24 Sussex Drive since that address became the official home of the prime minister of Canada in 1951. Mulroney remained at 24 Sussex while renovations on his new home in Montreal were being completed. Campbell instead took up residence at Harrington Lake, the PM's summer and weekend retreat, located in rural Quebec, north of Ottawa, and she did not move into 24 Sussex after Mulroney left. Like Charles Tupper and John Turner, Campbell never faced a Parliament during her brief tenure, as her term was filled by the summer break and the election campaign.

1993 election

Campbell waited as long as she could before asking Hnatyshyn to dissolve Parliament on September 8. Only weeks before Parliament was due to expire. The election was scheduled for October 25, the latest date it could be legally held under Section 4 of the Canadian Charter of Rights and Freedoms.

The Progressive Conservatives (PCs) were optimistic that they would be able to remain in power, and if not, would at least be a strong opposition to a Liberal minority government.

Campaign
Campbell's initial popularity declined after the writ was dropped. When she was running for the party leadership, Campbell's frank honesty was seen as an important asset and a sharp contrast from Mulroney's highly polished style. However, this backfired when she told reporters at a Rideau Hall event that the deficit or unemployment was unlikely to be much reduced before the "end of the century". During the election campaign, she further stated that discussing a complete overhaul of Canada's social policies in all their complexities could not be done in just 47 days; this statement was reduced to her having stated that an election is no time to discuss important issues.

The PCs' support tailed off as the campaign progressed. By October, polls showed the Liberals were well on their way to at least a minority government, and would probably win a majority without dramatic measures. Even at this point, Campbell was still considerably more popular than Liberal leader Jean Chrétien.  In hopes of stemming the tide, the PC campaign team put together a series of ads attacking the Liberal leader. The second ad appeared to mock Chrétien's Bell's palsy facial paralysis, and generated a severe backlash from the media, with some PC candidates calling for the ad to be pulled from broadcasts. Campbell disavowed direct responsibility for the ad, and claimed to have ordered it off the air over her staff's objections.

During the campaign, the PC support plummeted into the teens, while the Liberals, the Reform Party, and the Bloc Québécois gained in the polls. This assured that the Liberals would win a majority government.

Election defeat
On election night, October 25, the PCs were swept from power in a Liberal landslide. Campbell herself was defeated in Vancouver Centre by rookie Liberal Hedy Fry. She conceded defeat with the remark, "Gee, I'm glad I didn't sell my car."

It was only the third time in Canadian history that a prime minister lost his or her local riding at the same time that his or her party lost an election. All PCs running for re-election lost their seats, with the lone exception of Jean Charest, who was also the only surviving member of Campbell's cabinet. The PCs' previous support largely bled to the Liberals in Atlantic Canada and Ontario, while Reform inherited virtually all of the former Tory support in the west. The Bloc Québécois inherited most soft-nationalist Tory support in Quebec, and in some cases pushed Cabinet ministers from Quebec into third place.

The PCs still finished with over two million votes, taking third place in the popular vote, and falling only two percentage points short of Reform for second place. However, as a consequence of the first-past-the-post voting system, PC support was not concentrated in enough areas to translate into victories in individual ridings. As a result, the Tories won only two seats, compared to Reform's 52 and the Bloc's 54.  It was the worst defeat in party history, and the worst defeat ever suffered by a Canadian governing party at the federal level.

Some have pointed to gender inequality as a major contributing factor to her historic loss. University of New Brunswick professor Joanna Everitt writes that while media simply reported the facts about rival male leaders such as Jean Chrétien, Campbell's actions were usually interpreted as having some motive (drawing up support, appealing to a group, etc.)

Additionally, Mulroney left office as one of the most (and according to Campbell, the most) unpopular prime ministers since opinion polling began in the 1940s. He considerably hampered his own party's campaign effort by staging a very lavish international farewell tour at taxpayer expense, and by delaying his retirement until only  months were left in the Tories' five-year mandate.

Canadian humourist Will Ferguson suggested that Campbell should receive "some of the blame" for her party's losses, but that "taking over the party leadership from Brian (Mulroney) was a lot like taking over the controls of a 747 just before it plunges into the Rockies".

On December 13, 1993, Campbell resigned as party leader; Jean Charest succeeded her. Due to the brevity of her tenure as both prime minister (less than four years) and federal MP (less than six years), Campbell did not qualify for a prime ministerial or even a federal parliamentary pension.

Post–political career
Despite her dramatic loss in the election, Canadian women's magazine Chatelaine named Campbell as its Woman of the Year for 1993.  She published an autobiography, Time and Chance, in 1996. The book became a Canadian bestseller, and is in its third edition from the University of Alberta Bookstore Press.

She was briefly rumoured to be sent to Moscow as the ambassador to Russia, but in 1996, Campbell was appointed consul general to Los Angeles by the Chrétien government, a post in which she remained until 2000. While she was there, she collaborated with her husband, composer, playwright, and actor Hershey Felder, on the production of a musical, Noah's Ark.

From 1999 to 2003, she chaired the Council of Women World Leaders, a network of women who hold or have held the office of president or prime minister. She was succeeded by former Irish President Mary Robinson. From 2003 until 2005, she served as president of the International Women's Forum, a global organization of women of prominent achievement, with headquarters in Washington, DC. From 2001 to 2004, she was with the Center for Public Leadership, and lectured at the John F. Kennedy School of Government at Harvard University. She has served as a director of several publicly traded companies in high technology and biotechnology, and currently sits on the board of Athenex, a biopharmaceutical company that had its initial public offering on June 14, 2017, and trades under the ticker symbol ATNX.

Campbell chaired the steering committee of the World Movement for Democracy from 2008 to 2015. She served on the board of the International Crisis Group, a non-government organization (NGO) that aims to prevent and resolve deadly conflicts. She served on the board of the Forum of Federations, the EastWest Institute, and is a founding trustee of The International Centre for the Study of Radicalisation and Political Violence at King's College London. She was a founding member of the Club de Madrid, an independent organization whose main purpose is to strengthen democracy in the world. Its membership is by invitation only, and consists of former heads of state and government. At different times, Campbell has served as its interim president, vice president, and from 2004 to 2006, its secretary general. Campbell was the founding chair of the International Advisory Board of the Ukrainian Foundation for Effective Governance, an NGO formed in September 2007 with the aid of businessman Rinat Akhmetov.

During the 2006 election campaign, Campbell endorsed the candidacy of Tony Fogarassy, the Conservative candidate in Campbell's former riding of Vancouver Centre; Fogarassy went on to lose the election, placing a distant third. At that time, Campbell also clarified to reporters that she was a supporter of the new Conservative Party (formed in 2003 as a result of a merger of the Canadian Alliance with the party that Campbell had formerly led, the Progressive Conservatives); however, she later clarified in 2019 that she had, in fact, never joined the Conservative Party as an official member.

While testifying in April 2009 at the Mulroney–Schreiber Airbus inquiry, Campbell said she still followed Canadian politics "intermittently".

In April 2014, Campbell was appointed the founding principal of the new Peter Lougheed Leadership College at the University of Alberta.

She has appeared on the CBC Television program Canada's Next Great Prime Minister, a show which profiles and selects young prospective leaders, and has also been an occasional panelist on Real Time with Bill Maher.

On August 2, 2016, Liberal Prime Minister Justin Trudeau announced that Campbell had agreed to chair a seven-person committee to prepare a short list of candidates to succeed Thomas Cromwell on the Supreme Court of Canada. In mid-October 2016, the committee announced that it would recommend the appointment of Malcolm Rowe to the court, and he was sworn in on October 31 as the first Supreme Court justice to hail from Newfoundland and Labrador.

In August 2019, Campbell faced controversy when she said that she hoped that Hurricane Dorian would directly hit U.S. President Donald Trump's Mar-a-Lago estate in Florida. The President's son Eric responded to Campbell, saying that his family was "rooting for the safety" of those impacted by the hurricane. Campbell soon deleted the tweet and apologized for the remarks.

Campbell courted controversy on Twitter by claiming that female newscasters who expose their "arms" on TV are taken less seriously, despite having once posed with bare shoulders herself in a famously suggestive photograph.

Campbell revealed in Maclean's in 2019 that she could not survive in the Conservative party. She said: "It's too intolerant; it's too right-wing." She later argued after the 2019 federal election that Conservative leader Andrew Scheer was untrustworthy, stating "He's hard to trust, and that's really it."

In September 2022, Campbell attended Elizabeth II's state funeral, along with other former Canadian prime ministers.

Legacy

As justice minister, Campbell brought about a new rape law that clarified sexual assault and whose passage firmly entrenched that in cases involving sexual assault, "no means no". She also introduced the rape shield law, legislation that protects a person's sexual past from being explored during trial. Her legacy of supporting sexual victims has been confirmed through her work with the Peter Lougheed Leadership College at the University of Alberta, where the inaugural cohort of scholars proposed that the college immediately implement mandatory education regarding sexual assault for students, which Campbell readily accepted.

Since Parliament never sat during Campbell's four months as a prime minister, she was unable to bring forth new legislation, which must be formally introduced there. She did implement radical changes, though,  to the structure of the Canadian government. Under her tenure, the federal cabinet's size was cut from over 35 cabinet ministers and ministers of state to 23. This included the redesign of eight ministries and the abolition or merging of 15 others. The Chrétien government retained these new ministries when it took office.  The number of cabinet committees was reduced from 11 to five. Her successors have continued to keep the size of the federal Cabinet to about 30 members. She was also the first prime minister to convene a First Ministers' conference for consultation prior to representing Canada at the G7 Summit. Due to her brief time in office, Campbell holds a unique spot among Canadian prime ministers in that she made no Senate appointments.

Campbell harshly criticized Mulroney for not allowing her to succeed him before June 1993. In her view, when she became prime minister, she had very little time or chance to make up ground on the Liberals once her initial popularity faded. In her memoirs, Time and Chance, and in her response to The Secret Mulroney Tapes, Campbell suggested that Mulroney knew the Tories would be defeated in the upcoming election, and wanted a "scapegoat who would bear the burden of his unpopularity" rather than a viable successor. The cause of the 1993 debacle remains disputed, with some arguing that the election results were a vote against Mulroney rather than a rejection of Campbell, and others suggesting that the poorly run Campbell campaign was the key factor in the result.

Although the Progressive Conservatives survived as a distinct political party for another decade after the 1993 debacle, they never recovered their previous standing. During that period they were led by Jean Charest (1993–1998), Elsie Wayne (1998) and then, for the second time, by Joe Clark (1998–2003) (who had been Opposition Leader and briefly Prime Minister 20 years earlier). By 2003, the party under new leader Peter MacKay had voted to merge with the Canadian Alliance to form the Conservative Party of Canada, thus ceasing to exist, despite MacKay having promised not to pursue a merger. Joe Clark continued to sit as a "Progressive Conservative" into 2004. The new generation of right-leaning Conservatives gained power in the election of 2006, ensuring the "Tory" nickname's survival in the federal politics of Canada. A PC "rump" caucus continued to exist in the Senate of Canada (consisting of certain Clark, Mulroney and Paul Martin appointees), but as of 2012 only one senator, Elaine McCoy of Alberta, sits as a Progressive Conservative.

Campbell remains one of the youngest women to have ever assumed the office of Prime Minister in any country, and thus also one of the youngest to have left the office.

Campbell was ranked number 20 out of the first 20 prime ministers of Canada (through Jean Chrétien) by a survey of 26 Canadian historians used by J. L. Granatstein and Norman Hillmer in their 1999 book Prime Ministers: Ranking Canada's Leaders. A follow-up article co-authored by Hillmer in 2011 for Maclean's magazine broadened the number of historians surveyed; in this new survey of over 100 Canadian historians, Campbell again finished last, this time coming at number 22 out of Canada's first 22 prime ministers (through Stephen Harper). A 2016 follow-up poll by the same team, now expanded to cover the first 23 prime ministers (through Justin Trudeau), again ranked Campbell last.

In 2004, she was included in the list of 50 most important political leaders in history in the Almanac of World History compiled by the National Geographic Society. She was cited for her status as the only woman head of government of a North American country (defined variously), but controversy ensued among academics in Canada over the merit of this honour, since her brief term in office was marked by very few, if any, major political accomplishments.

On November 30, 2004, Campbell's official portrait for the parliamentary prime minister's gallery was unveiled. The painting was created by Victoria, BC artist David Goatley. Campbell said she was "deeply honoured" to be the only woman to have her picture in the prime ministers' corridor, stating: "I really look forward to the day when there are many other female faces." The painting shows a pensive Campbell sitting on a chair with richly coloured Haida capes and robes in the background, symbolizing her time as a cabinet minister and as an academic.

Honours

 

  

According to Canadian protocol, as a former Prime Minister, she is styled "The Right Honourable" for life.
Appointed a Companion of the Order of Canada on Canada Day 2008
 Member of the Board, Forum of Federations.

Scholastic

 Chancellor, visitor, governor, and fellowships

Honorary Degrees

Appointments

Memberships and fellowships

Arms

See also
 
 Time and Chance (Kim Campbell)

Archives 
There is a Kim Campbell fond at Library and Archives Canada. The archival reference number is R10052, former archival reference number MG26-S. The fond covers the date ranges 1916 to 2004. It contains a variety of media including 58.13 meters of textual records, approximately 33542 photographs and 139 videocassettes among other media.

Notes

References

Further reading
 Grace Stewart, Heather. Kim Campbell: the keener who broke down barriers (2007). Jackfruit Press. .
 Granatstein, J.L. and Hillmer, Norman. Prime Ministers: Ranking Canada's Leaders. Toronto: HarperCollins Publishers Ltd., 1999. .

External links

 Official Blog of the Right Honourable Kim Campbell
 Official Website of the Right Honourable Kim Campbell
 
 Biography from the Kennedy School of Government
 2004 commencement speech, Mount Holyoke College 
 CBC Digital Archives – Kim Campbell, First and Foremost
 Official page of the documentary film "Kim Campbell:Through the Looking Glass"
 
 

1947 births
People from Port Alberni
Living people

Prime Ministers of Canada
Defence ministers of Canada
Attorneys General of Canada
Members of the 24th Canadian Ministry
Members of the 25th Canadian Ministry
Members of the House of Commons of Canada from British Columbia
Progressive Conservative Party of Canada MPs
British Columbia Social Credit Party MLAs
British Columbia school board members

Canadian autobiographers
Canadian corporate directors
Canadian diplomats
Canadian political scientists
Lawyers in British Columbia

Harvard Kennedy School staff
Alumni of the London School of Economics
Peter A. Allard School of Law alumni
University of British Columbia alumni

Canadian expatriates in France
Canadian people of Scottish descent

Women prime ministers
Women government ministers of Canada
Women members of the House of Commons of Canada
Women MLAs in British Columbia
Women political scientists
Female defence ministers
Female justice ministers
Female Canadian political party leaders
Canadian women in business
Canadian women diplomats
Canadian women lawyers
Women autobiographers

Canadian King's Counsel
Companions of the Order of Canada
Honorary Fellows of the London School of Economics
Members of the Order of British Columbia
Members of the King's Privy Council for Canada

20th-century women rulers
Canadian female first ministers